Time Incorporated can refer to:

Time Inc., the publishing arm of Time Warner
Time Incorporated, an alternate title for the Doctor Who serial The Ultimate Foe